The Great Waltz is a  musical conceived by Hassard Short with a book by Moss Hart and lyrics by Desmond Carter, using themes by Johann Strauss I and Johann Strauss II.  It is based on a pasticcio by Erich Wolfgang Korngold and Julius Bittner called Walzer aus Wien, first performed in Vienna in 1930.  The story of the musical is loosely based on the real-life feud between the older and younger Strauss, allegedly because of the father's jealousy of his son's greater talent.

The Great Waltz debuted on Broadway at the Center Theatre on September 22, 1934 and ran for 289 performances. The production was directed by Hassard Short and presented by Max Gordon, with choreography by Albertina Rasch, settings by Albert Johnson and costumes by Doris Zinkeisen together with Marion Claire, Marie Burke and Guy Robertson.  The musical was made into a motion picture by MGM in 1938 with a screenplay and new lyrics by Oscar Hammerstein II.  

In 1949 impresario Edwin Lester hired Robert Wright and George Forrest to adapt Strauss's German lyrics and music for a production at the Los Angeles Civic Light Opera. This version was used for a London revival that opened at the Drury Lane Theatre on July 9, 1970 and ran for 605 performances.  It was also used for a 1972 film remake.

Songs
Act I
Radetsky March – The Brass Band
Morning – Therese ((Resi), Ebeseders' daughter)
Look Before You Leap – Therese and Leopold ((Poldi), Greta's nephew)
You Are My Songs – Resi, Johann Strauss, Jr. ((Schani)) and Ensemble
Love Will Find You – Resi and Schani
On Love Alone – Ensemble and Ballet
Like a Star in the Sky – Countess Olga Baranskaja and Schani
With All My Heart – Resi

Act II
Night – Ensemble
Love's Never Lost – Olga, Poldi and Captain Hal Fredrich
We Love You Still – Olga 
While You Love Me – Resi and Schani
Love and War – Poldi and Ensemble
The Blue Danube (Danube So Blue) – Resi and Company

The 1970 London revival added "No Two Ways" (lyrics: George Forrest, music: Robert Wright)

References

External links

1934 musicals
Broadway musicals
Musicals inspired by real-life events